Tom Gregory (born April 24, 1960) is an American entertainer and socio-political commentator.

Biography

Tom Gregory is an actor, radio personality, and a socio-political and entertainment industry commentator.  He maintains a home in Southampton NY and an apartment in Manhattan's historic co-op, the Rockefeller Apartments.
Tom and David Bohnett were domestic partners for over eleven years.

Media

Tom Gregory's media forums include his webisode GregoryWayTV.com, his Huffington Post column, and regular radio dispatches for Leeza Gibbons' internationally syndicated program Hollywood Confidential. He has also been featured on CNN, E!, and Fox News, among other outlets, and was the face of OVGuide.com, one of the Internet's leading sources for indexing online video content. Gregory debuted as a Broadway producer on the 2009 Tony Award-nominated revival of Guys and Dolls at the Nederlander Theatre.

Hollywood memorabilia

Tom Gregory has been a noted collector of autographed, archival Hollywood photographs. Included in his collection are a photo of Marilyn Monroe circa 1955 that is personalized to James Dean; an image of Boris Karloff in full Frankenstein monster regalia; an exquisite portrait of Greta Garbo that is one of only a few known copies in the world, and the largest photo known to be signed by Abraham Lincoln. 
Hollywood memorabilia in his collection are the cowboy shirts worn by Heath Ledger and Jake Gyllenhaal in the film Brokeback Mountain as well as the suit, shirt, tie and campaign pin worn by Sean Penn during his Oscar-winning performance in Milk The auction bids for these items have benefited different children's charities.

Philanthropy

Tom Gregory's philanthropic involvement also spans both coasts. In Los Angeles, he teaches after-school acting classes for preteens, drawing on his own acting experience gained in repertory companies in East Hampton, New York, Delray Beach, Florida, and across the United States. In Southampton New York, Tom Gregory helped found the Lake Agawam Conservation Association to clean up the lake's fragile eco-system.

LGBT rights

As an ardent supporter of human rights and civil liberties, for years Tom wrote prolifically on LGBT issues in his articles for the Huffington Post. His media and philanthropic efforts on the behalf of the LGBT communities rest on his faith in the institution of America's promise of equality and justice for all its citizens.  He was also a major contributor to the "No on Prop 8" campaign. He is said to be a Libertarian.

References

External links
Tom Gregory’s Blog at the Huffington Post

1960 births
Living people
American philanthropists
Collectors
American LGBT rights activists
American radio producers
American LGBT broadcasters